The International Festival of the Sea was held at H.M. Naval Base, Portsmouth between 24  and 27 August 2001.  It was the third in a series of International Festivals of the Sea held in the United Kingdom since 1996.  The event allowed people to walk around the Naval Base, to go on board many of the visiting vessels, including several vessels belonging to the Royal Navy.  It also allowed people to visit the historic dockyard, including HMS Victory and  Mary Rose. There were also many maritime displays, street entertainers, military bands, music concerts and unique shops.

According to the event's patron, Her Royal Highness the Princess Royal, the festival was a "celebration of all things maritime".

History
The first International Festival of the Sea took place in Bristol in 1996 with the Royal Navy as primary participants.  Following the declining numbers of visitors to Portsmouth Navy Day's encouraged the Royal Navy to invite the festival to Portsmouth for the first time in 1998.  The event was highly successful with over 200,000 visitors.  So the festival returned in 2001.

Special Events
Many events were held during the four days of the festival.  Most of the spectacular events were military in genre, some displaying the most modern of hardware, whilst others showed of historical equipment.  Other events, such as concerts and children's activities.

Operation Island Storm
The main military event of the festival was Operation Island Storm, a demonstration of British military ability confronted by a situation most likely in today's world.  It involved a hostage situation off the West African coast, and the Royal Marines operation to free them.

A specially constructed island in the harbour was the site of the action, which was held every afternoon of the event.  It was the biggest display of British military hardware during the whole of 2001.

Lists of Ships
Numerous ships of different capacities and from various nations attended the event.

These lists are not complete

Royal Navy Ships

 Type 42 destroyer
 
 
 
 
 
 
 Type 23 frigate
 
 
 
 
 
 
 
 
 
 
 
 
 
 Other Ships
 
 
 RV Triton

Ships of Other Navies
  - 
  -  
  - 
  -

Tall Ships

 Albatros -  
 Artemis - 
 Astrid - 
 Christian Radich - 
 Cisne Branco - 
  - 
 Dar Młodzieży - 
 Europa - 
 Grand Turk - 
 Granvillaise - 
 Kaliakra - 
 La Recouvrance - 
 Lord Nelson - 
 Matthew - 
 Mir - 
 Oosterschelde - 
 ORP Iskra - 
 Palinuro - 
 Pogoria - 
 Prince William - 
 Renard - 
 Royalist - 
 STS Sedov - 
 Shabab Oman - 
 Shtandart - 
 Sorlandet - 
 Statsraad Lehmkhul - 
 Swan fan Makkum - 
 Zenobe Gramme -

Sponsors
 BAE Systems
 Rolls-Royce
 BP
 Vosper Thornycroft
 Royal Mail
 Raytheon Systems Limited
 Portsmouth Historic Dockyard
 Portsmouth City Council

References

 International Festival of the Sea, 2001 - Official Souvenir Programme

2001 in England
Festivals in Hampshire
Royal Navy
2000s in Hampshire